Myza is a rural locality (a village) in Kargopolsky District, Arkhangelsk Oblast, Russia. The population was 3 as of 2012.

Geography 
Myza is located 7 km west of Kargopol (the district's administrative centre) by road. Lukino is the nearest rural locality.

References 

Rural localities in Kargopolsky District